The Glamour is a novel by Christopher Priest published in 1984.

Plot summary
The Glamour is a novel in which a cameraman becomes an amnesiac.

Reception
Dave Langford reviewed The Glamour for White Dwarf #60, and stated that "The Glamour should be read rather than described in all its strange detail; hypnotic, tricky, uneasy and full of double meaning, it demands to be reread the moment you've finished. Excellent."

Reviews
Review by Faren Miller (1985) in Locus, #288 January 1985
Review by Paul Kincaid (1985) in Vector 124/125
Review by Richard Mathews (1985) in Fantasy Review, June 1985
Review by Algis Budrys (1985) in The Magazine of Fantasy & Science Fiction, October 1985
Review by D. W. 'Doc' Kennedy (1985) in Rod Serling's The Twilight Zone Magazine, October 1985
Review by Don D'Ammassa (1985) in Science Fiction Chronicle, #73 October 1985
Review by Judith Hanna (1985) in Interzone, #11 Spring 1985
Review by David Pringle (1988) in Modern Fantasy: The Hundred Best Novels

References

1984 British novels